Exaeretia sutschanensis is a moth in the family Depressariidae. It was described by Hans-Joachim Hannemann in 1953. It is found in Afghanistan, the Russian Far East (Ussuri) and Korea.

References

Moths described in 1953
Exaeretia
Moths of Asia